Lionel Chevrier,  (April 2, 1903 – July 8, 1987) was a Canadian Member of Parliament and cabinet minister.

Life and career
Born in Cornwall, Ontario, the son of former Cornwall mayor Joseph E. Chevrier, he was educated in Cornwall, at the University of Ottawa, the University of Montreal and Osgoode Hall. Chevrier was called to the bar in 1928 and was named King's Counsel in 1939. He married Lucienne Brûlé in 1932. He was first elected as a Liberal candidate in the Ontario riding of Stormont in the 1935 federal election. He was re-elected in the 1940, 1945, 1949, and 1953 elections. He resigned in 1954, when he was appointed the first president of the Saint Lawrence Seaway Authority. Returning to politics, he was elected in the 1957 election in the Quebec riding of Laurier. He was re-elected in the 1958, 1962, and 1963 elections.

From 1943 to 1945, he was Parliamentary Assistant to the Minister of Munitions and Supply. From 1945 to 1954, he was the Minister of Transport. He was President of the Privy Council from April 25, 1957 to June 20, 1957. From 1963 to 1964, he was the Minister of Justice and Attorney General of Canada. From 1957 to 1963, he was the Official Opposition House Leader and Liberal Party House Leader.

He resigned from the House of Commons in 1964 to become the Canadian High Commissioner in London. He held that position until 1967.

In 1967, he was made a Companion of the Order of Canada. In 1997, Canada Post issued a stamp in his honour.

References
 
 Lionel Chevrier fonds - Library and Archives Canada.
 
 Foreign Affairs and International Trade Canada Complete List of Posts 
 

Canadian Ministers of Transport
Liberal Party of Canada MPs
Members of the House of Commons of Canada from Ontario
Members of the House of Commons of Canada from Quebec
Members of the King's Privy Council for Canada
Lawyers in Ontario
People from Cornwall, Ontario
Franco-Ontarian people
Companions of the Order of Canada
1903 births
1987 deaths
High Commissioners of Canada to the United Kingdom
Canadian King's Counsel